In Orbit is the second studio album by Petra Marklund, performing as September. It was released on 26 October 2005 by Catchy Tunes, making it September's first album with the label. The album was supported by three singles; "Satellites", "Looking for Love" and "Cry for You", all which reached at top twenty in Sweden, and two promotional singles; "Flowers on the Grave" and "It Doesn't Matter". The album debuted and peaked at 17 on the Swedish Album Chart, and peaked at 36 on the Finnish Album Chart. In Poland, the album was re-released as a limited edition in 2007, including remixes and a DVD with music videos. This edition peaked at No. 10 and was certified Gold for sales of over 10,000 units. September won a Swedish Grammis Award for In Orbit in the category Club/Dance of the Year in February 2006.

Track listing
All songs written by Jonas von der Burg, Anoo Bhagavan and Niclas von der Burg, except "Looking for Love" written by J. von der Burg, Bhagavan, N. von der Burg, Steve Elson and Dave Stephenson, and "Midnight Heartache" written by J. von der Burg, Bhagavan, N. von der Burg, Donna Weiss and Jackie DeShannon.

Notes

 The Polish limited edition replaces the album version of "Cry for You" with its single edit, with the album version being moved down as the thirteen track. 
 The Polish limited edition bonus DVD also includes a photo gallery comprising four photos.

Charts

Awards

References

2005 albums
Petra Marklund albums